The Legal Aid Society of the District of Columbia is the oldest and largest civil legal aid organization in Washington, D.C.

Created in 1932, the Legal Aid Society provides representation and legal services to indigent residents of the District of Columbia in areas like domestic violence (including restraining orders), housing, public benefits, and consumer law. During the recession of 2008 to 2009, the Legal Aid Society managed to expand legal services even as gifts from lawyers and law firms declined 15 to 20 percent. In 2014, it provided legal services to approximately 8,800 indigent Washingtonians. In 2017, it filed a lawsuit in federal court alleging widespread problems with the District’s food stamp program.

See also
 Public Defender Service for the District of Columbia
 Legal Aid Society (New York City)
 Legal Aid Society of Cleveland

References

External links

 Making Justice Real, the official blog of the Legal Aid Society of D.C.

Legal advocacy organizations in the United States
Non-profit organizations based in Washington, D.C.
1932 establishments in Washington, D.C.
Legal aid in the United States